Ililabalekan is a volcano located in the south-central part of the island of Lembata, Indonesia.

See also 
 List of volcanoes in Indonesia

References 
 

Ililabalekan
Ililabalekan
Ililabalekan
Holocene stratovolcanoes